Deyan Nedelchev is a Bulgarian pop singer, showman and composer. He has issued 16 albums and 9 maxi singles, including projects with his colleagues, some with his brother Boyko. He won the Grand-prix at the Golden Orpheus international festival in 1993 at the contest for new Bulgarian pop songs with the song 'Dedication'. Deyan is the only Bulgarian singer to record an album with Polygram, with whom he had a 3-year contract based in Johannesburg, South Africa.He
has released his last two albums in Japan with a company Orphictone

Outside Bulgaria the singer prefers to use his surname Angeloff and he is known as Deyan Angeloff.

Biography 
Deyan was born in Ruse, Bulgaria, in 1964. He began to sing when he was 3 years old. In 1979 he was encouraged by winning a "young talent" prize in Ruse. One year later Deyan won second prize in the same contest. In 1981 Deyan and his group 2+1 won the runner-up prize in the young talent festival in Ruse. Later he became lead vocalist of the bands "Heros", "Helios", ensemble "Magistrali" and the Ensemble of The Bulgarian Construction Forces. In April 1988 Deyan and the Ensemble of The Bulgarian Construction Forces took part in the Pop Song Competition in Sofia. In 1989 he won the prize of the Bulgarian Conservatory at the festival "Rock Under The Stars" in Primorsko. In 1989 he recorded his biggest hit"Love For Love" ("Обич За Обич). This song won the prize of the Bulgarian Writers' Union in the radio-contest "Spring 1989". The song was included in the chart "500 Greatest Bulgarian Songs". In April 1990 Deyan and the Ensemble of Bulgarian Construction Forces were on tour in the Soviet Union. The same year Deyan participated in "The Golden Orpheus" pop song competition. Balkanton released his first single"A Plea To The World". In 1993 he won Grand-prix of the International Pop Song Festival "The Golden Orpheus" as a performer of song in the contest for new Bulgarian pop songs. In 1994 Nedelchev won 1st and 2nd prizes for Bulgarian pop song in the same festival. In 1995 Deyan took part in the 5th festival "The Voice Of Asia" in Almati and won the 2nd prize. In 1996 he and Margarita Hranova performed the song  "I Made You Into A Song" in "The Golden Orpheus". The same year he and his brother Boyko won the prize "Duet of Bulgaria". In 1997 Deyan signed a three-year contract with PolyGram for 3 years. He now prefers to use his middle name Angeloff. With Polygram he released the album "Grande Amore". Later he took part in music festivals in Egypt and moved to South Africa. In April 2000 Deyan and Boyko won silver medal and golden cup at the music festival in North Korea. Then Deyan was vocalist of Art Studio Voin and the rock group BG Rock. In 2001 Deyan and Boyko recorded the song "Ikebana". This song become an internet hit in 2010. In 2003 Deyan lived and worked in Canary Islands where he performed in a Bee Gees tribute show. In 2004 his song "Sweet Love" was nominated by Bulgarian National Radio for best lyrics. In 2006 he took part in the Eurovision song contest and his song reached the semi-finals. In the summer of 2010 he recorded his new single "In The Forest". In April 2012 Deyan released his album"The Old Man". In November 2012 his song with Bulgarian DJ Kris Master "Your Life Is So Good" entered the "Beat 100" chart. In March 2013 Deyan took part in the first season of the reality show "The Mole" and was voted in second place. In October 2013 Deyan was invited to participate in a new generation reality show created by the Dutch company Endemol. The show was called "Next, Please' and premiered in Bulgaria the same month with Bashar Rahal as the Host. Deyan participated there as Maestro Ikebana.12.07.2019, at the Military Medical Academy Sofia, Deyan Nedelchev was operated successfully by a knot of vocal cords by Doctor Doncho Donchev.On 10.02.2020, Deyan underwent a successful operation for an inguinal hernia,  “Tsaritsa Joanna” - ISUL by Prof. Dr. Nikolay Penkov.In May 2020, Deyan recorded a song for Bulgarian Prime Minister Boyko Borissov - "I have a wonderful country." The song has a great success and became a hit again, first on the Internet.CreDirect is a brand that offers flexible and modern online lending solutions. For this brand Deyan shot 3 short videos on the music of his song 'In The Woods', with 3 different lyrics. The ads have been running with great success since June 2021 on YouTube and since January 2022 on all TV channels.

Career
1979
Runner-up prize at the young talent competition in Ruse
1980
Second prize at the young talent competition in Ruse
1981
Runner-up prize as a member of the vocal band "2 plus 1" at the young talent competition in Ruse
1982
A soloist of the band "Heroes"Concerts in Ruse and the region
1984
Gold and silver medal for his group from the Bulgarian Army Ensemble Competition in Burgas
19851986
Soloist of the band "Helios".
1987
Soloist of ensemble "Highways" (Ministry of Transport) in Sofia
1988
Contestant in the Bulgarian Pop Song Competition in Sofia
April 1988/1990
Soloist of the ensemble of engineering armies
1988
Deyan takes place in the final of the preliminary round of the festival "Golden Orpheus"in Pazardzhik with the song "Power" with back vocalists Militsa Bozhinova & Roz Mari Dragneva,but doesn'rankes for the festival in Sunny Beach  the same year.
1989
The prize of BG state's conservatory of the festival "Rock under the stars"Primorsko
AprilSecond prize of the contest for young singers of the youth's contest for entertaining songSofia
AprilPrize of the Bulgarian writers' union in the radiocontest "Spring-89" for the song "Love for Love"
Honorary prize on the festival"Music City Hall" NashvilleUSA for the song "Over 100 enemies", sent there in notes.
1990
A tour in the Soviet Union with the ensemble of engineering armies
AprilFirst prize in the radiocontest of Bulgarian National Radio "Spring-90" for the song "With Fire Bestow Me"Sofia
JuneParticipation in the 22nd international festival of BG pop song "The Golden Orpheus" in the contest for BG songsSunny Beach. BG
AugustThe company Balkanton releases his first maxi-single on SP
August2-nd prize from the international festivalThe melody of the friends,Ulaan Bator,Mongolia
The movie "Protected Land" is made to an album "A Plea To The World", the production is based on the problems of еcology, poverty and famine around the world and Bulgaria. The movie took part in the international expo in Chicago, USA and had been bought from many mass media.
1992
МarchAugustWorking in Italyparticipations in night bars with a ballet.
1993
Deyan takes place in the final of the preliminary round of the festival "Golden Orpheus"in Sofia with 3 songs-"Love-dream" as a composer,"Selfdevotion" with his brother Boyko and "Dedication".Only the song"Selfdevotion" doesn't rankes for the festival in Sunny beach.
1993
JuneThe Grand Prix for a performer of BG song and 1st prize for composition and performance of BG song in the 24th International festival of BG pop song "The Golden Orpheus" in the contest for BG songs for the songs "Dedication" and "LoveDream"Sunny Beach.
1994
SeptemberThe public's award of the International festival "A Step To Parnasus"Моscow, Rusria
SeptemberFirst and second prizes for performance of BG songs in the 25th International festival for BG pop song of "The Golden Orpheus" in the contest for BG song, Sunny Beach, Bulgaria for the songs "Where are You" and "Give Me Your Hand"
October- a Mediterranean cruise on the ship 'Taras Shevchenko'in a program for a couple of weeks with his brother Boyko.
1995
JuneSecond prize for a singer in the 5th International festival "The Voice of Asia", Аlmati,Kazakhstan
AugustParticipation in the 26th International festival of BG pop song in "The Golden Orpheus" in the contest for BG song in duet with Margarita Hranova for the song "I turned You Into A Song", Sunny Beach, Bulgaria
SeptemberEighth prize of the International song festival for the song "New Year", Cairo, Egypt
1996
MaySecond prize in the radio contest "Spring'96" of Bulgarian National Radio for the song "I am Afraid That I Love You" in duet with his brother Boyko, Sofia
JuneParticipation in the 2nd festival for song "The Silver Eros" in Plovdiv, BG with the song "Eyes Like Magic" with his brother Boyko
JuneParticipation in the 8th International festival "The Golden Deer" in Brashov, Rumania
JuneAugustSecond prize in the 2nd International song festival in Cairo, Еgypt for the song "Like Life" in duet with his brother Boyko and participation in the International recital in the festival
AugustSeptemberParticipation in the 27th International festival for BG pop song in the contest BG song in duet with Galya Stilyanchevska, Sunny Beach, Bulgaria
SeptemberParticipation in the 1st festival for "Love duets" in Sofia with his brother Boyko with the song "I'll Survive From Love" and duet with Margarita Hranova with the song "I turned You Into A Song"
DecemberThe prize "Duet of Bulgaria for 1996" with his brother Boyko for the annual musical awards of ART Rock center and nomination for a singer of the year
1997
AugustSigning of the contract with the recording company "PolyGram" for 3 years in Johannesburg, South Africa
AugustFourth prize in the 3d International song festival in duet with his brother Boyko for the song "Breath", Cairo, Egypt
1998
FebruaryThe prize of merit in the International festival "South Pacific international song contest in Mercure resort. Surfers Paradise, Australia, for the song "Zlatno Mome" sent in notes
1999
MarchParticipation in the festival in Outhshorn, South Africa
AugustParticipation in the 5th International song festival in a duet with his brother Boyko for the song "Love-Flash", Cairo, Еgypt
20002002
A soloist again in the ensemble of engineering armies and "Art studio Voin"- private formation.
2000
AprilThird prize, silver medal and colden cup in the 16th international spring festival of arts in Pyongyang, North Korea in duet with his brother Boyko
JuneParticipation in the 5th festival "Love Duets" with Rumyana Kotseva for the song "Anexplicable", Sofia
2001
JuneParticipation in the day of musicfestival in Mоntpellier and Cres in France
2002
Participation in the musical "The Return Of The Birds" '2001
A soloist for brief of the rock band "BG Rock"
MayFirst prize in the 14th International festival for singers "Sarandev", in the contest for BG song, in duet with Radostina Koleva for the song "If It existed...", Dobritch, Bulgaria
JuneParticipation in the International recital of the arts "Slavianski bazar" in Vitebsk, Belarus with Margarita Hranova and Yulduz Ibrahimova
2003
JuneParticipatedn in the festival of Russian song, Sofia
2003September 2004
MayWorking in Spain, The Canary Islands in a show "Bee Gees" in big hotels there
2004December 2005
MayWorking in England
2004
The song "Sweet Love" is nominated for best lyrics and performance from BG radio for 2004 as well as in the top charts of Bg Top 100 of BTV
2006
FebruaryThe song "To You" is semifinalist of the contest for Bulgarian Eurovision
FebruaryThe song "To Elvis" received "The President's Choice" award of BillboardUSA, by notesa duet with Margarita Hranova
FebruaryMayWorking in Canary Islands, Spain, as a member of show "Bee Gees"
2006
December2008 FebruaryWorking in Canary Islands, Spain, as a member of show "Bee Gees"
2008
April2009 JanuaryWorking in Canary Islands, Spain, as a member of show "Bee Gees" and disco show with the hits from the 70s and 80s.
2009 
AprilSeptemberWorking in duo 'Mojo' with rock musician Fish and appears on London ExFactor and gets till 3rd round-300 persons, among all 38,000 appearing persons
JulyParticipate in gay parade in London, UK
SeptemberWorking in Canary islands, Spain with show 'SPARKLE' and his colleagues Bojidar Hristov and piano player and singer Ekaterina Mihaylova
2010
JanuaryThe old song "From ikebana the wood have pain", which is recorded in 2001 by brothers Deyan and Boyko Angeloff becomes the most famous and watched super disco hit of Bulgaria through the internet.
MayThe song "In the forest" turned out for 1 night into the second big super disco hit of Deyan Angeloff for 2010, again composed by Deyan 
OctoberThe song "The old man" turned in the 3rd super disco hit of Deyan Angeloff for 2010, composed by Deyan 
2011
JulyParticipate in gay parade in Lanzarote, Canary Islands, Spain
JuneNew single "On the meadow" turned in the next superhit of Deyan for summer 
2012
AprilThe single "The differents/Non-standarts" turned in the next superhit of 2012 for Deyan starting in the Summer, composed by Deyan again
DecemberThe song "Two and a half men" turns into again in the next hit of Deyan in duet with the musician Gumzata from the show of Slavi, prompted personally from Slavi Trifonov in April 2012
2013-
February-Deyan participates in 11 epizod in tv serial of BTV 'Mladost 5'
March–June -Deyan takes part in the first season of reality show 'The mole' and placed fourth in a field of 6 finalist.
May -comes out the new single hit'Vip persons'
September-Deyan and Rumyana Kozeva sing the song 'Asleep houses' in the festival in Petrich' Golden chestnut' and the song wins 3rd place
2013October 2014
JuneDeyan is chosen to participates in new generation reality show, created by the Dutch company Endemol. The show is called 'The nexy one, please' and started in Bulgaria on 5.10., Deyan participates there as Maestro Ikebana. This type of show is made in many countries in the world.
2014
September-participation in 5th festival for pop and rock music 'Sofia sings' with the song 'Ah, this rain' with Rumyana Kozeva
2015
January–April- working in piano night-bar 'Stars'with pianist Krasimir Petrov,quitar man Ivan Manoloff and colleague singer Iva Ralcheva in hotel 'Black sea' in Varna
2015-February 2016
May-Deyan begins working again in Canary islands,Lanzarote,Spain with colleagues Nikolay Naydenov and Kiril Metodiev as show' Tribute to Bee Gees' and show 'Disco hits from 70th and 80th'
2016
Deyan participates with the young Italian saxophonist Bruno Mancini in the fest of Onano,Italy
2016
October-Deyan works in Gran Canaria,Canary islands ,Spain with slovakian musician Roberto in the hotels.
2016 November-2017 September
Deyan starts working in piano night-bar 'Stars'with pianist Krasimir Petrov,quitar man Konstantin Jambazov,quitar man George Peterson,pop singer Iva Ralcheva,pianist Matey Krasimirov in hotel 'Black sea' in Varna
2016
December-Deyan receives from Annual awards for fashion and showbusiness  in Varna  prize in the category Most scandalous pop singer of the Year
2017 October 2018
July-Deyan starts working in piano night-bar 'Stars'with pianist Krasimir Petrov,quitar man Konstantin Jambazov,quitar man George Peterson,pop singer Iva Ralcheva,pianist Rosen Atanasov and singer Maria Mihaleva in hotel 'Black sea' in Varna
2018 January
Deyan causes an uproar with his new hit about the leader of the Bulgarian Socialist Party - Kornelia Ninova "Crossing A Red Light"
2018 September- November 
Deyan starts working in piano-bar 'SM' with pianist Rosen Atanasov,saxophonist Veselin Pavlov and his colleague ,the singer Iva Ralcheva in Varna
2018 December-2019 January
Deyan works in pubs,bars and restaurants in Playa de las Americas in Tenerife,Canary islands,Spain
2019 March
Deyan  works in restaurant 'Raybera' & night bar'Avangard' in his native city Ruse
2019 July
12.07.2019, at the Military Medical Academy Sofia, Deyan Nedelchev was operated successfully by a knot of vocal cords by Doctor Doncho Donchev.
2021 September
Deyan receives from Annual awards for fashion,style and showbusiness in Varna prize in the category #1 singer of the Year
2022 June
Deyan receives from Annual awards for fashion,style and showbusiness in Varna prize in the category ''Pop artist of the Year
2022 June
Deyan receives from Annual awards for fashion,style and showbusiness in Varna prize for overall creativity

Discography 
 "Greetings From Struma"1987 (single), vinil-BALKANTON
 "A Plea To The World"1990 (with Margarita Hranova, and Orlin Goranov), LP-VINIL-BALKANTON
 "Deyan Nedelchev"1990 (single), vinil-BALKANTON
 "A Game Of Love"1991; [with Boyko Nedelchev], LP-VINIL-BALKANTON
 "Madly In Love"1992 [with Boyko Nedelchev]-LP-VINIL-BALKANTON
 "The Best of Deyan and Boyko Angeloff 1988-1992"1992-MC-BALKANTON
 "My misic"/La mia musica/1993 (with Gianni Neri and Massimo Marconi)-LP-VINIL AND MC -BALKANTON AND UNISON RECORDS
 "Love-DreamDedication"1993 (double album) [with Boyko Nedelchev]-LP-VINIL-BALKANTON
 "Love For Love"1993-[with Boyko Nedelchev]-MC-SUBDIBULA
 "La Palestriade"1993-/maxi-single/-MC-MEGA MUSICA
 "The Greatest Hits"1995-[with Boyko Nedelchev]-MC-MARBLI
 "Atlanta"1996 (with Margarita Hranova, Ivelina Balcheva and Orlin Goranov)-MC-BALKANTON
 "Brothers"1996-[with Boyko Nedelchev]-CD-BALKANTON
 "Gently News"1997-[with Boyko Nedelchev]-CD-RIVA SOUND
 "Grande Amore"1998-CD-POLYGRAM, SOUTH AFRICA
 "The Big Ones"2001-/maxi-single/-CD-MEGA MUSICA, MC-POLYCOMERCE
 "God, How You Are Beautiful!"2002-[with Boyko Nedelchev]-CD-ACSIOR
 "To You"2005-CD-CMP
 "Nessun Dorma"2008-CD-BG COMPANY
 "The old man"2012-CD-BG COMPANY
 "To be"2015-CD-BG COMPANY
 "Do not stop!"2019(double album) [with Konstantin Jambazov]-CD-ORPHICTONE,JAPAN
 "Crossin' a red light"2019-CD-ORPHICTONE,JAPAN
 "Fly again "2022 [with Konstantin Jambazov]-CD-ORPHICTONE,JAPAN
 "I will take my tears from the rapids"2022-CD-ORPHICTONE,JAPAN

References 

 
 Facebook page
 Facebook profile
 Facebook profile
 DEYAN-ANGELOFF on Allmusic
 Deyan Nedelchev on MySpace

Bulgarian pop singers
20th-century Bulgarian male singers
English-language singers from Bulgaria
1964 births
Living people
21st-century Bulgarian male singers